Qotbabad (also Romanized as Qoţbābād; also known as Kowtbābād and Qutbābād) is a city and capital of Kordian District, in Jahrom County, Fars Province, Iran.  At the 2006 census, its population was 6,450, in 1,581 families.  At the 2016 census, its population was 7,476, in 2,250 families.

References

Populated places in Jahrom County
Jahrom County

Cities in Fars Province